Francis Young may refer to:
Francis Young (rugby union), New Zealand rugby union player
Francis Brett Young (1884–1954), English novelist, poet, playwright, and composer
Francis E. Young (1876–1958), American civil rights leader and union organizer

See also
Frances Young (born 1939), British theologian and Methodist minister
Frank Young (disambiguation)